Koksilah is an anglicization of Hwulqwselu, a Hunquminum word meaning "place of snags" and adapted to mean a corral, in reference to the community that grew up around a settler's homestead which had one.  It may refer to:

Koksilah, British Columbia, a community just southeast of the City of Duncan, British Columbia
the Koksilah River, which is the namesake of the community
Koksilah River Provincial Park, a protected area
Koksilah River Falls, a waterfall on the Koksilah River
Koksilah Ridge, a mountain in the area